This is a list of regulated "Microfinance Deposit-taking Institutions" in Uganda.

 FINCA Uganda Limited
 Pride Microfinance Limited
 UGAFODE Microfinance Limited
 EFC Uganda Limited
 YAKO Microfinance Limited

See also
 Banking in Uganda
 List of banks in Uganda
 List of licensed credit institutions in Uganda
 List of companies based in Uganda

References

External links
 Microfinance Deposit Taking Institutions (MDIs)
  List of Microfinance Institutions in Uganda

Uganda
Microfinance institutions
Finance in Uganda